The Jefes de Fuerza Lagunera is a Mexican professional basketball team based in Torreón, Coahuila, Mexico. The team is a member of the Liga Nacional de Baloncesto Profesional (LNBP). The team was founded in 2014 and plays their home games in the Auditorio Municipal de Torreón.

Franchise history 
In their initial season (2014–15), the Jefes went 20–20 in the regular season and finished tied for 6th place under head coach Daniel Jaule. The team also had two players selected for the All-Star game: Rayes Gallegos and Jordan Glynn. With the 7th-place finish the Jefes qualified for the playoffs and lost to the Pioneros in the quarterfinals 4–1.

For their second season the Jefes had Francisco Olmos Hernández as head coach. The team opened the season 17–16 and were making a playoff push until they were forced to forfeit their last 6 games due to not meeting roster regulations because of player suspensions. The suspensions were due to an on-court fight against players from rival Correcaminos. After the suspensions and the ruling of game forfeitures by the league, head coach Olmos resigned and went on to coach the Atenienses de Manatí, of Puerto Rico's National Superior Basketball (BSN) league. Assistant coach Pedro Carrillo took over as interim head coach and the team ended the season at 17–22, last in the league.

Season by season results

Current roster

See also
Liga Nacional de Baloncesto Profesional
FIBA Americas League

References

External links
Jefes de Fuerza Lagunera official site
Liga Nacional de Baloncesto Professional
FIBA Americas League
LatinBasket website

Torreón
Sports teams in Coahuila
Basketball teams in Mexico
Basketball teams established in 2014
2014 establishments in Mexico